Tomasz Wróblewski (born 2 June 1980), stage name Orion, is a Polish musician, best known as the bassist and backing vocalist for extreme metal band Behemoth. Since 1997, he also is a member of symphonic black metal band Vesania, as a lead vocalist and guitarist.

Biography
Wróblewski was born in Warsaw. In 2002, he became bassist of doom metal band Neolithic and was a member of the group till 2006 when they were disbanded. In 2003, he joined Behemoth as session bassist. After the departure of Mateusz "Havoc" Śmierzchalski, Orion switched to guitar. In 2004, Behemoth was joined by session guitarist Patryk "Seth" Sztyber, while Orion took bass again, and became an official member. In 2010 with members of defunct band Neolithic, Orion formed the rock band Black River. The group eventually split up after releasing two albums, due to vocalist Maciej Taff's retirement from the music industry because of health condition.

Orion is endorsed by ESP/Ltd, Mark Bass and DV Mark.

Discography 

Behemoth
Demigod (2004)
Slaves Shall Serve (2005)
Demonica (2006)The Apostasy (2007)At the Arena ov Aion – Live Apostasy (2008)Ezkaton (2008)Evangelion (2009)Abyssus Abyssum Invocat (2011)The Satanist (2014)I Loved You at Your Darkest (2018)Opvs Contra Natvram (2022)

Vesania
 2002: Wrath ov the Gods / Moonastray 2003: Firefrost Arcanum 2005: God the Lux 2007: Distractive Killusions 2008: Rage of Reason 2014: Deus Ex MachinaNeolithic My Beautiful Enemy (2003)Team 666 (2004)

 Other
 Vader – And Blood Was Shed in Warsaw (DVD, 2007, guest appearance)
 Vulgar – I Don't Wanna Go To Heaven (EP, 2009, guest appearance)
 Vulgar – The Professional Blasphemy (2010, guest appearance)
 My Riot – Sweet Noise (2011, guest appearance)
 Leash Eye – V.I.D.I. (2011, record producer)
 Devilish Impressions – Simulacra (2012, guest appearance)
 Sammath Naur – Beyond the Limits'' (2012, guest appearance)

Equipment 
ESP Tom Araya Signature 4-String Basses (tuned G#-C#-F#-B and B-E-A-D)
Custom ESP TA 5-String Bass (tuned G#-C#-F#-B-E)
LTD F-255FM Series Bass, LTD B-500 4-String Bass, LTD TA-600 Bass, Spector Rex 5 Bass, JB Custom 5-String Bass (Based on the B.C. Rich Beast Bass)
 MarkBass Standard 104HF, Amp Frame 800, T1M, EQ42S, MVVL
 Hesu Cables
 DV Mark C 412 Standard, Triple 6

References

External links 

 Orion's profile on Facebook

Behemoth (band) members
Polish heavy metal bass guitarists
1980 births
Living people
Black metal musicians
Death metal musicians
Musicians from Warsaw
Polish heavy metal singers
English-language singers from Poland
Polish lyricists
20th-century Polish male  singers
21st-century Polish male singers
21st-century Polish singers
Male bass guitarists
21st-century bass guitarists
Polish male guitarists